Cristiena Voiculescu  (born ) is a retired Romanian female volleyball player.

She was part of the Romania women's national volleyball team.
She played at the 1994 FIVB Volleyball Women's World Championship. On club level she played with Universitatea Bacau.

Clubs
 Universitatea Bacau (1994)

References

1967 births
Living people
Romanian women's volleyball players
Place of birth missing (living people)